Johan Ariff bin As'ari (born 3 December 1986) is a Malaysian actor. He gained attention after starring in Juvana and appeared as a contestant on season 1 of Fear Factor Selebriti Malaysia.

Early life
Johan was born in Bukit Mertajam, Penang. He is the son of Datuk As’ari Ibrahim, Political Secretary to former Malaysia's Minister of Works Dato' Shaziman Abu Mansor. His sister, Farah Alya was also an actress from 2007 to 2009.

Career
Johan's first role was in television series Penunggu Gunung Raya.

In 2016, Johan appeared in the drama Mr Tanda Soal as the lead role.

Filmography

Film

TV Show

Television series

TV Films

Television

Music video

Drama radio

References

External links

 

1986 births
Living people
Malaysian male actors
People from Penang
Malaysian television personalities